The Belmont Library is a branch of the Multnomah County Library, located in Belmont, Portland, Oregon. The original library building opened in 1924 and was expanded in 1937 with the addition of a children's room. The brick building had small round windows and large oak tables. Renovations during 1999–2000 nearly doubled the library's capacity.

The branch offers the Multnomah County Library catalog of two million books, periodicals and other materials. The Belmont Library features a 24-person capacity meeting room for hosting community events at no charge on a first come, first served basis. A decorative quilt made by residents of the Sunnyside neighborhood is also housed within the building.

History
In 1923, residents of the Belmont and Hawthorne areas of southeast Portland raised funds to construct a library building at East 39th Avenue and Taylor Street (now S.E. César E. Chávez Blvd. and S.E. Taylor Street). The Library Association of Portland paid for the building plans. According to the association president, the Belmont effort was one of the first in Portland during which library users raised funds to erect a branch library building in their own neighborhood. The neighborhood presented the building debt-free to the association in early 1924, and the  library opened on March 7, 1924.

Federal funds through the Works Progress Administration paid for expansion of the library in 1937. Even so, circulation at the library continued to grow until the floor area was considered inadequate. In 1996, voters approved a bond measure to renovate the county's libraries and to pay special attention to four of them, including Belmont. The branch closed in June 1999 for remodeling and reopened in March 2000. The renovated library can hold up to 20,000 volumes. Self-checkout stations and security gates were installed in 2011 during a minor renovation.

Over the years the library has hosted numerous activities, including a children's jamboree, knitting groups, lectures and readings. The building also serves as a ballot drop-off site during elections.

See also
 List of Carnegie libraries in Oregon

References

External links

 Official website

1924 establishments in Oregon
Libraries in Portland, Oregon
Library buildings completed in 1924
Multnomah County Library
Libraries established in 1924
Sunnyside, Portland, Oregon